Karl Hanssen (5 July 1887 – 13 September 1916) was a German international footballer.

References

1887 births
1916 deaths
Association football forwards
German footballers
Germany international footballers
Altonaer FC von 1893 players
German military personnel killed in World War I